Tarany is a village in Somogy county, Hungary. It is one of the villages in which some traditions of the Somogy Slovenes have survived.

External links 
 Street map (Hungarian)

References 

Populated places in Somogy County
Hungarian Slovene communities in Somogy County